François Philippus Lodewyk Steyn (born 14 May 1987) is a South African professional rugby union player who currently plays for the South Africa national team and Cheetahs (rugby union) in Pro 14. He usually plays at inside centre, fullback or wing.

Steyn is one of only two South African rugby players to have won the Rugby World Cup twice, with both achieving them twelve years apart. He was a key member of the South African team that won the 2007 Rugby World Cup and part of the team that won the 2019 Rugby World Cup, with Os Du Randt (1995 and 2007) being the first two time Springbok winning player. 
Steyn was a key member of the Springboks team that beat the British and Irish Lions in 2009. He is known for his long distance kicking ability and strong tackling.

Club career

Sharks (2007–2009)
In his debut season of Super 14 rugby for the Sharks, Steyn was selected on the right wing, however, was moved to fullback when Percy Montgomery was injured. He played as the last line of defence until Percy Montgomery returned for the game against the Blues in Round 11, and was moved to fly-half for this game.

Racing Metro (2009–2012)
In April 2009, Steyn signed a two-year contract with French Top 14 club Racing Métro 92 for an estimated €750,000 per season.

Sharks (2012–2013)
Steyn rejoined The Sharks by signing a 3-year deal on 29 May 2012. Back with his old team, Steyn played in the Sharks' final two league matches of the 2012 Super Rugby season, helping them to make the finals series. Steyn was not available to them for the knock-outs due to his late entry into the squad. The Sharks went on to lose in the final to The Chiefs.

The player made his return for the Sharks in the 2013 Super Rugby competition, captaining the side in the first few matches in the absence of regular skipper, Keegan Daniel. Steyn struggled with form early on in Super Rugby, but as the season progressed, he began to regain the form that first earned him Springbok honours. Once again though, Steyn was injured in the Sharks league match against the Highlanders in Dunedin, which they lost. Steyn would have to wait until the Currie Cup semi-final of 2013 against the Free State Cheetahs to make his next appearance. He was subbed early on in the match, but was again selected for the final against DHL Western Province. Steyn's contributions on attack were good, but it was his immense defense that really marked his successful comeback, and helped the Sharks to Currie Cup victory in 2013. After only 2 matches back, Steyn was not selected for the Springbok end of year tour in 2013.

Toshiba Brave Lupus (2014–2016)
On 3 June 2014 Steyn signed a two-year deal with Japanese club Toshiba Brave Lupus.

Montpellier (2016–2020)
In February 2016, Steyn joined French club Montpellier Hérault Rugby.

International career

He debuted at wing against Ireland, he scored a try on his debut. In his next international match he was moved to fullback against England, scoring a long range drop-goal, from his own half. Steyn has shown to possess superb goal kicking qualities as well.

Steyn kicked two drop goals in the 2007 Tri Nations opener against Australia at Newlands Stadium in Cape Town, to win the game for the Springboks. One of these, a 42-metre effort from a fielded clearance kick next to the sideline, and another three minutes from time next to the posts about 30 metres out.

In South Africa's first game at the 2007 Rugby World Cup, their centre Jean de Villiers got injured. Steyn replaced him, playing only his second  game at professional level at inside centre, but he made a break on first touch of the ball and his inclusion sparked the Springboks to a 37–0 second half demolition of Samoa.

On 24 September 2007 Steyn was cited to appear before a disciplinary hearing for allegedly biting Tongan winger Joseph Vaka during the Springboks v. Tonga 2007 Rugby World Cup game on 22 September. (Match report). Both players were sent to the sinbin in the 60th minute for an off-the-ball incident. He was subsequently cleared of the charge, due to insufficient evidence and Vaka conceding that the apparent "bite mark" could have been received during normal play.

Steyn was the starting inside centre for the Springboks in the 2007 Rugby World Cup Final, he made a fantastic break that resulted in a penalty for the Boks and also converted one himself later on in the game. He is therefore the youngest player to win a Rugby World Cup.

In the Springboks' final match of the 2009 Tri Nations against New Zealand, his last match with the Boks before his departure for France, he converted three penalties from within his own half of the field; he is believed to be the first player ever to do so in a Test match.

Reaching his 50th test cap against Argentina in Cape Town in 2012, Steyn is the youngest South African to reach the milestone. Steyn was injured during the 2012 Rugby Championship, missing the final 2 matches, along with the Currie Cup, and the end of year tour to the UK.

Steyn was re-called for South Africa for the 2017 series against France due to the injuries of Pat Lambie and Handre Pollard, after a 3-year absence from international rugby.

In 2019, Steyn was again called up as part of the South African team to play in the 2019 Rugby World Cup in Japan and became one of the few players to have won two World Cups, the second only for South Africa.

References

External links

1987 births
Living people
People from Aliwal North
Afrikaner people
South African people of Dutch descent
South African rugby union players
South Africa international rugby union players
Rugby union fullbacks
Alumni of Grey College, Bloemfontein
Expatriate rugby union players in France
Expatriate rugby union players in Japan
Racing 92 players
Toshiba Brave Lupus Tokyo players
Sharks (rugby union) players
Sharks (Currie Cup) players
South African expatriate rugby union players
South African expatriate sportspeople in France
South African expatriate sportspeople in Japan
Montpellier Hérault Rugby players
Free State Cheetahs players
Cheetahs (rugby union) players
Rugby union players from the Eastern Cape